Bad Hair is the debut studio album by South African hip hop artist Nasty C. It was released by Mabala Noise Entertainment on 23 September 2016. The album was made available for streaming and free digital download on Audiomack on the same day of its release, and was added to iTunes on 24 September 2016. It features guest appearances from Omari Hardwick, Riky Rick, Tshego, Tellaman, Erick Rush and Rowlene. Nasty C executive produced the album, along with contributions from "Ganja Beatz", "The Gobbla", "Alie Keyz" and "Gemini Major". The album was supported by one single —"Hell Naw".

Background and promotion
Nasty C album tops "iTunes" and "Audio Mack" charts at number 1 spot. The album was made available for free digital streaming on "Audiomack". Within 24 hours to the official release and the album became the most streamed South African album of all time on the music platform. To promote the album, Nasty C called out on his fans via Twitter on 9 August 2016 to send a "head-shoulder" portrait with your bad hair to specific email. On 30 August 2016 Nasty C unveiled the cover of his awaiting debut album on Instagram and also used the medium to say "thank's to everybody that was a part of his album cover".

The song titled "A Star Is Born", which features American poet Omari Hardwick and South African rapper Riky Rick did not make it to the retail version of the track list, due to the song's samples not having been cleared in time.

Singles
The album's first promotional single, "Hell Naw" was released on 11 February 2016. On 1 March 2016, the music video was released for "Hell Naw" and it was shot by "Teddy Maxx", Edited By "Nasty C" & "Pierre", Directed By "Nasty C" & "Teddy Maxx". On 25 May 2016 the single was classified a hit by The Times.

Track listing

Release history

Bad Hair Extensions 

Nasty C released Bad Hair Extensions, an extended version of his debut album Bad Hair on 2 December 2016. It features 4 new songs and a guest appearance from American hip hop recording artist, French Montana.

Additional track listing

References

Nasty C albums
2016 debut albums
Mabala Noise Entertainment albums